Against ignorance is a Humanist group founded in Kochi, Kerala in early 2014. The first major event of the group was held on the 12th of February 2014. The event was a bike-a-thon and the bikers rode an estimated 100 miles (160 kilometers) from Edapally in the city of Kochi to Thrissur to attend the ViBGYOR Film Festival. This campaign came in the wake of the reinstatement of Section 377 of the Indian Penal Code, which criminalises sexual activities "against the order of nature", arguably including homosexual acts in India. The group also conducted multiple of Free Hugs campaigns in Kochi. The group gained popularity following the media attention it gained after these events.

References

Human rights organisations based in India